Rundisen is a small glacier at Kongsøya in Kong Karls Land, Svalbard. The glacier covers part of Rundisflya at the eastern part of Kongsøya, south of Svenskebukta.

References

Glaciers of Svalbard
Kongsøya